Cunlhat is a commune in the Puy-de-Dôme department in Auvergne-Rhône-Alpes in central France.

People
Cunlhat was the birthplace of Maurice Pialat (1925–2003), film director and actor.

See also
Communes of the Puy-de-Dôme department

References

Communes of Puy-de-Dôme